The Top End blind snake (Anilios guentheri) is a species of snake in the family Typhlopidae. The species is endemic to Australia.

Etymology
The specific name, guentheri, is in honor of German-born British herpetologist Albert Günther.

Geographic range
In Australia, A. guentheri is found in the state of Western Australia and in Northern Territory.

References

Further reading
Boulenger GA (1893). Catalogue of the Snakes in the British Museum (Natural History). Volume I., Containing the Families Typhlopidæ ... London: Trustees of the British Museum (Natural History). (Taylor and Francis, printers). xiii + 448 pp. + Plates I-XXVIII. (Typhlops guentheri, new combination, p. 20).
Hedges SB, Marion AB, Lipp KM, Marin J, Vidal N (2014). "A taxonomic framework for typhlopid snakes from the Caribbean and other regions (Reptilia, Squamata)". Caribbean Herpetology (49): 1-61. (Anilios guentheri, new combination).
Peters W (1865). "Einen ferneren Nachtrag zu seiner Abhandlung über Typhlopina". Monatsberichte der Königlichen Preussischen Akademie der Wissenschaften zu Berlin 1865: 259-263 + one unnumbered plate. ["Typhlops (Onycocephalus) Güntheri ", new species, pp. 259–161 + figures 1, 1a, 1b, 1c]. (in German).
Robb J (1966). "The Generic Status of Australasian Typhlopids (Reptilia: Squamata)". Ann. Mag. Nat. Hist., Thirteenth Series 9: 675–679. (Rhamphotyphlops guentheri, new combination, p. 676).

Anilios
Reptiles described in 1865
Taxa named by Wilhelm Peters
Snakes of Australia